Corner of My Eye is the debut EP released by Spencer Tracy in March 2001 by Rocket Records.

The EP reached number 14 on the AIR Top20 Singles Charts. "Corner of My Eye" received airplay on Triple J and RTRFM which led to the band undertaking several tours of the east coast of Australia and supporting Echo and the Bunnymen, The Fauves, iOTA, Lo-Tel and Midnight Oil. "Corner of My Eye" was also featured on the Kiss My WAMI 2001 compilation album.

Track listing 
All tracks written by Lee Jones unless otherwise noted.

Personnel

Spencer Tracy
 Lee Jones - guitar, vocals, piano
 John Rabjones - guitar, vocals
 Kim Jones - bass guitar
 Shaun Sibbes - drums, vocals

References

2001 debut EPs
Spencer Tracy (band) EPs